The 1871 California gubernatorial election was held on September 6, 1871, to elect the governor of California. Incumbent Henry Haight lost his bid for reelection.

Results

References

1871
California
gubernatorial
September 1871 events